Broich may refer to:

Places in North Rhine-Westphalia, Germany
(The i is not pronounced, and the o in turn is lengthened; the phenomenon is called Rheinisches Dehnungs-i; the word signifies 'swamp'.)

Broich, a part of Dormagen
Broich, a part of Engelskirchen in the Oberbergischer Kreis 
Broich, a part of Eschweiler in the Aachen region, location of Broich Manor
Broich, a part of Jülich 
Broich, a part of Kürten
Broich, a part of Mülheim an der Ruhr, location of Castle Broich
Broich, a part of Oberkassel in the Beuel district of Bonn
Broich, a part of Würselen in the Aachen region
The historical county of Limburg-Broich

People
Thomas Broich, German football player
Friedrich Freiherr von Broich, German World War II panzer commander
Guido Peter Broich, Physician, National Health Service Expert and Director in Italy

Other uses
Division von Broich/von Manteuffel, a German World War II provisional infantry division

Surnames of German origin